Level of service (LOS) is a qualitative measure used to relate the quality of motor vehicle traffic service. LOS is used to analyze roadways and intersections by categorizing traffic flow and assigning quality levels of traffic based on performance measure like vehicle speed, density, congestion, etc. In a more general sense, levels of service can apply to all services in asset management domain.

Level-of-Service in the United States of America
The following section pertains to only North American highway LOS standards as in the Highway Capacity Manual (HCM) and AASHTO Geometric Design of Highways and Streets ("Green Book"), using letters A through F, with A being the best and F being the worst, similar to academic grading.

A: free flow. Traffic flows at or above the posted speed limit and motorists have complete mobility between lanes. The average spacing between vehicles is about 550 ft(167m) or 27 car lengths. Motorists have a high level of physical and psychological comfort. The effects of incidents or point breakdowns are easily absorbed. LOS A generally occurs late at night in urban areas and frequently in rural areas.

B: reasonably free flow. LOS A speeds are maintained, maneuverability within the traffic stream is slightly restricted. The lowest average vehicle spacing is about 330 ft(100 m) or 16 car lengths. Motorists still have a high level of physical and psychological comfort.

C: stable flow, at or near free flow. The ability to maneuver through lanes is noticeably restricted and lane changes require more driver awareness. Minimum vehicle spacing is about 220 ft(67 m) or 11 car lengths. Most experienced drivers are comfortable, roads remain safely below but efficiently close to capacity, and posted speed is maintained. Minor incidents may still have no effect but localized service will have noticeable effects and traffic delays will form behind the incident. This is the target LOS for some urban and most rural highways.

D: approaching unstable flow. Speeds slightly decrease as traffic volume slightly increases. Freedom to maneuver within the traffic stream is much more limited and driver comfort levels decrease. Vehicles are spaced about 160 ft(50m) or 8 car lengths. Minor incidents are expected to create delays. Examples are a busy shopping corridor in the middle of a weekday, or a functional urban highway during commuting hours. It is a common goal for urban streets during peak hours, as attaining LOS C would require prohibitive cost and societal impact in bypass roads and lane additions.

E: unstable flow, operating at capacity. Flow becomes irregular and speed varies rapidly because there are virtually no usable gaps to maneuver in the traffic stream and speeds rarely reach the posted limit. Vehicle spacing is about 6 car lengths, but speeds are still at or above 50 mi/h(80 km/h). Any disruption to traffic flow, such as merging ramp traffic or lane changes, will create a shock wave affecting traffic upstream. Any incident will create serious delays. Drivers' level of comfort becomes poor. This is a common standard in larger urban areas, where some roadway congestion is inevitable.

F: forced or breakdown flow. Every vehicle moves in lockstep with the vehicle in front of it, with frequent slowing required. Travel time cannot be predicted, with generally more demand than capacity. A road in a constant traffic jam is at this LOS, because LOS is an average or typical service rather than a constant state. For example, a highway might be at LOS D for the AM peak hour, but have traffic consistent with LOS C some days, LOS E or F others, and come to a halt once every few weeks.

Most design or planning efforts typically use service flow rates at LOS C or D, to ensure an acceptable operating service for facility users.

Multimodal LOS
The 2010 HCM incorporates tools for multimodal analysis of urban streets to encourage users to consider the needs of all travelers.  Stand-alone chapters for the bicycle, pedestrian, and transit have been eliminated, and methods applicable to them have been incorporated into the analyses of the various roadway facilities.

The primary basis for the new multimodal procedures is NCHRP Report 616: Multimodal Level of Service Analysis for Urban Streets. This research developed and calibrated a method for evaluating the multimodal LOS (MMLOS) provided by different urban street designs and operations. This method is designed for evaluating “complete streets,” context-sensitive design alternatives, and smart growth from the perspective of all users of the street. It is used to evaluate the tradeoffs of various street designs in terms of their effects on the perception of auto drivers, transit passengers, bicyclists, and pedestrians of the quality of service provided by the street.

LOS for At-Grade Intersections
The HCM defines LOS for signalized and unsignalized intersections as a function of the average vehicle control delay. LOS may be calculated per movement or per approach for any intersection configuration, but LOS for the intersection as a whole is only defined for signalized and all-way stop configurations.

When analyzing unsignalized intersections that are not all-way stop-controlled, each possible movement is considered individually. Each movement has a rank. Rank 1 movements have priority over rank 2 movements, and so on. The rank of each movement is as follows, with the major road being the road whose through movement moves freely, the minor road being controlled by stop signs. As for vehicular movements that conflict with pedestrian movements of the same rank, pedestrians have priority:
 through movements on the major road, parallel pedestrian movements, and right turns from the major road. LOS for movements of this rank is trivial, because LOS is determined by control delay. These are "free" movements, and the control delay is always zero.
 includes left turns from the major road.
 includes through movements on the minor road, parallel pedestrian movements, and right turns from the minor road.
 includes left turns from the minor road.
Movements are analyzed in order of rank, and any capacity that is left over from one rank devolves onto the next rank. Because of this pecking order, depending on intersection volumes there may be no capacity for lower-ranked movements.

Modern Roundabouts
The 2000 HCM provides skeleton coverage of modern roundabouts, but does not define LOS: the measure of effectiveness is the quotient of the volume to the capacity. A modern roundabout in the United States is a roundabout in which traffic inside the circle always has priority. Entering traffic is controlled by a yield sign.

LOS in other Transportation Network Elements
Performance of other transportation network elements can also be communicated by LOS. Among them are:
 Two-lane roadways (uninterrupted flow)
 Multilane roadways (4 or more lanes) (uninterrupted flow)
 Open freeway segments
 Freeway entrances (merges), exits (diverges), and weaving lanes
 Bicycle facilities (measure of effectiveness: events per hour; events include meeting an oncoming bicyclist or overtaking a bicyclist traveling in the same direction)
 Pedestrian facilities (HCM measure of effectiveness: pedestrians per unit area)

Theoretical Considerations
The LOS concept was first developed for highways in an era of rapid expansion in the use and availability of the private motor car. The primary concern was congestion, and it was commonly held that only the rapid expansion of the freeway network would keep congestion in check.

Since then, some professors in urban planning schools have proposed measurements of LOS that take public transportation into account. Such systems would include wait time, frequency of service, time it takes to pay fares, quality of the ride, accessibility of depots, and perhaps other criteria.

LOS can also be applied to surface streets, to describe major signalized intersections. A crowded four-way intersection where the major traffic movements were conflicting turns might have an LOS D or E. At intersections, queuing time can be used as a rubric to measure LOS; computer models given the full movement data can spit out a good estimate of LOS.

While it may be tempting to aim for an LOS A, this is unrealistic in urban areas. Urban areas more typically adopt standards varying between C and E, depending on the area's size and characteristics, while F is sometimes allowed in areas with improved pedestrian, bicycle, or transit alternatives. More stringent LOS standards (particularly in urban areas) tend to necessitate the widening of roads to accommodate development, thus discouraging use by these alternatives. Because of this, some planners recommend increasing population density in towns, narrowing streets, managing car use in some areas, providing sidewalks and safe pedestrian and bicycle facilities, and making the scenery interesting for pedestrians.

An LOS standard has been developed by John J. Fruin for pedestrian facilities. The standard uses American units and applies to pedestrian queues, walkways, and stairwells. This standard is not considered a good measure of pedestrian facilities by the planning or engineering professions, because it rates undesirable (and hence unused) sidewalks with an LOS A, while pedestrians tend to prefer active, interesting sidewalks, where people prefer to walk (but rate a worse LOS on this scale). To rectify this and other issues, The National Cooperative Highway Research Program (NCHRP) is conducting a project to enhance methods to determine LOS for automobiles, transit, bicycles, and pedestrians on urban streets, with particular consideration to intermodal interactions.  Similarly, Transport for London's Pedestrian Comfort Guidance for London (2010/2019) "goes further than existing measures such as Fruin Level of Service which simply assess crowding. [The London guidance] is based on comfort and takes into account user perceptions as well as observed behaviours".

Walking

Queuing

Stairs

The A to F scale deals only with delays and service reliability. These delays are typically caused by congestion, breakdowns or infrequent service. It assumes there is a service in place that people can use. It also implies that poor LOS can be solved by increased capacity such as additional lanes or overcoming bottlenecks, and in the case of transit, more buses or trains. It does not deal for instance with cases where there is no bridge across a river, no bus or train service, no sidewalks, or no bike-lanes.

An expanded LOS might look like:
0 - No service exists. Latent demand may exist.
1 - Service is poor, unsafe or discouraging. Demand is suppressed below socially desirable levels.
A-F - As per existing LOS scale.
G - Further expansion of capacity is limited.
H - No expansion is possible. Radical or innovative solutions are required

LOS in the United Kingdom of Great Britain and Northern Ireland

The LOS measure is much more suited to American roads than roads in Europe and the UK, but the HCM is used. The technique is in UK textbooks but is sparingly used. The individual countries of the UK have different bodies for each area's roads, and detailed techniques and applications vary in Scotland, England and Wales, but in general the practice is the same.

Rural and urban roads are in general much busier than in the U.S, and service levels tend to be to the higher end of the scale, especially in peak commuting periods. It is acceptable for roads to operate at 85% capacity, which equates to LOS D and E.

In general, the principle is to take the volume of traffic in one hour and divide by the appropriate capacity of the road type to get a v/c rating, which can be cross-referenced to the textbooks with tables of v/c ratings and their equivalent LOS ratings. The lack of definitive categories towards LOS D, E and F limit the use, like a D or E category on an urban road, would be acceptable.

In certain circumstances, the UK shortens the LOS categories to just A-D. A and B indicate free-movement of traffic (i.e. under 85% capacity), C reaching capacity 85%-100%, D over capacity. Little reference to this can be found in textbooks and it may just be an 'unwritten engineering practice', agreed with certain authorities.

LOS in the Commonwealth of Australia
In Australia LOS are an integral component of Asset Management Plans, defined as the service quality for a given activity. LOS are often documented as a commitment to carry out a given action or actions within a specified time frame in response to an event or asset condition data.

Refer Austroads Guide to Traffic Management Part 3 for a comprehensive explanation.

References

Transportation engineering